Torbat-e Jam County is in Razavi Khorasan province, Iran. The capital of the county is the city of Torbat-e Jam. At the 2006 census, the county's population was 239,395, in 53,510 households. The following census in 2011 counted 262,712 people in 65,817 households. At the 2016 census, the county's population was 267,671 in 71,802 households. Salehabad District was separated from the county in 2018 to form Salehabad County.

Administrative divisions

The population history and structural changes of Torbat-e Jam County's administrative divisions over three consecutive censuses are shown in the following table. The latest census shows five districts, 13 rural districts, and five cities.

References

 
Counties of Razavi Khorasan Province